Harekrushna Mahatab (21 November 1899 – 2 January 1987) was the leader of the Indian National Congress, a notable figure in the Indian independence movement and the Chief Minister of Odisha from 1946 to 1950 and again from 1956 to 1961. He was popularly known by the sobriquet "Utkal Keshari".

Early life
Harekrushna Mahtab was born at Agarpada village in Bhadrak district of Odisha. He was born to Krushna Charan Das and Tohapha Debi in an aristocratic Khandayat family. After passing his matriculation examination from Bhadrak High School, he joined Ravenshaw College, Cuttack but left his studies in 1921 to join the independence movement.

Political career
In 1922, Mahatab was imprisoned and charged with sedition. He was the Chairman of Balasore District Board from 1924 to 1928. He became the member of Bihar and Odisha Council in 1924. He joined the Salt Satyagraha movement and was imprisoned again in 1930. He was elected as the General Officer Commanding of Congress Sevadal for the AICC session at Puri in 1932 and he was arrested when the party was banned. He participated in the movement against untouchability in 1934 and opened his ancestral temple to all for the first time in Odisha. Later, he started Gandhi Karma Mandir at Agarpada. He was the President of Utkal Pradesh Congress Committee from 1930 to 1931 and again in 1937. He was nominated to the Congress Working Committee by Subhas Chandra Bose in 1938 and continued till 1946 and again from 1946 to 1950. He was the President of State Peoples' Enquiry Committee in 1938 and recommended cancellation of Sanada of the rulers and merger of the erstwhile princely states with Odisha Province. He participated in the Quit India Movement in 1942 and was imprisoned from 1942 to 1945.

Mahatab was the first Chief Minister of Odisha from 23 April 1946 to 12 May 1950. He was the Union Minister of Commerce and Industry from 1950 to 1952. He became the secretary general of the Congress Parliamentary Party in 1952. He was the Governor of Bombay from 1955 to 1956. After resigning from Governorship in 1956, he again became the Chief Minister of Odisha from 1956 to 1960. During his tenures as the Chief Minister, he played significant role in the merger and integration of former princely states, shifting of the capital from Cuttack to Bhubaneshwar and the sanction and construction of the multi-purpose Hirakud Dam Project. He was elected to the Lok Sabha in 1962 from Angul and became the vice-president of the Indian National Congress in 1966. In 1966, he resigned from the Congress and led the Orissa Jana Congress. He was elected to the Odisha Legislative Assembly in 1967, 1971 and 1974. He was imprisoned in 1976 for protesting against the Emergency.

Intellectual pursuits
He was the founder of the Prajatantra Prachar Samiti and started the weekly magazine Prajatantra in 1923 at Balasore, which later became the Daily Prajatantra. He was the chief editor of a monthly journal Jhankar since its inception. He also published the Weekly English paper The Eastern Times and was its chief editor.

He received the Sahitya Academy award in 1983 for the third volume of his well-known work, Gaon Majlis.

Awards and honours
He was the President of Orissa Sahitya Academy and Sangit Natak Academy for a couple of terms. He received an honorary Doctorate degree from Andhra University, an honorary D.Litt. from Utkal University and an honorary Doctorate of Law from Sagar University.
The Odisha State Central Library, the apex library of the state public library system of Odisha is named after him as Harekrushna Mahtab State Library. It was established in 1959 with 3 acre campus at state capital, Bhubaneswar.

References

External links

Orissa Chief Ministers List
Orissa Chief Ministers
Official biographical sketch in Parliament of India website

1899 births
1987 deaths
Governors of Bombay
Chief Ministers of Odisha
Members of the Constituent Assembly of India
Indian independence activists from Odisha
Prisoners and detainees of British India
Journalists from Odisha
Indian National Congress politicians
Ravenshaw University alumni
20th-century Indian journalists
Odia-language writers
Indians imprisoned during the Emergency (India)
Chief ministers from Indian National Congress
Recipients of the Sahitya Akademi Award in Odia
Indian male journalists
People from Bhadrak district
Utkal Congress politicians
Commerce and Industry Ministers of India
India MPs 1962–1967